The USS Macaw (ASR-11) was a Chanticleer-class submarine rescue ship in service with the United States Navy fron 1943 to 1944.

History
Macaw was laid down 15 October 1941 by the Moore Dry Dock Company, Oakland, California; launched 12 July 1942; sponsored by Miss Valnessa Easton of Berkeley, Calif.; and commissioned exactly one year later.

Departing California 28 August 1943, after shakedown and training exercises, Macaw steamed in convoy to Espiritu Santo, arriving 2 October. Thence proceeding to Funafuti, via Wallis Island, she charted previously unknown reefs. She anchored off Funafuti on the 16th and remained until 13 November when she was ordered back to Pearl Harbor. After six weeks in Hawaii, Macaw departed for Midway Island.

Sinking
Macaw was scheduled to take part in the Marshall Islands campaign and was transiting back to Honolulu due to contaminated water tanks when she stopped at Midway Atoll. Suddenly on 18 January 1944, Macaw received orders to rescue a submarine from a nearby reef. She headed out as 20-35 knot winds from the west and rough seas had pushed the submarine  onto the coral reef. Attempting to get a line to the stricken sub, the Macaw herself, under the command of the Midway harbor pilot, ran aground. The motor room and generator room were flooded with diesel oil and sea water.

Breakers began striking the stern of the ship. Circa 7 m (23 feet) of Macaws stern projected into the channel which threatened to further restrict passage to the submarine base. Keeping the channel clear was a high priority, therefore salvage attempts began as soon as possible. , arriving 24 January, placed a crew on board Macaw after Flier was freed from the reef. Three separate attempts were made to refloat Macaw and pull her off, all without success. Due to bad weather conditions, salvage work was difficult and attempts to provision the crew on board were sometimes impossible.  Weather continued to hamper salvage work during the first week of February. Attempts to provision the crew on board the wreck were difficult and sometimes impossible.  Wind and seas during the night of 11 February 1944 increased to a full gale. During the following day Macaw took on a heavy starboard list and seas began breaking over the ship's superstructure. Around 1800 hrs the pronounced list was suddenly reduced as Macaws stern swung south and submerged in deeper water. The commanding officer, executive officer, and 20 Macaw crewmen remained on board during the night of 12 February. With deteriorating conditions, the remaining crew was forced to take shelter in the pilothouse and after 0230 hrs the crew was forced to abandon ship into the heavy seas. Two 6 m (19.7-foot) boats from Midway Naval Operating Base capsized during rescue attempts, with the loss of three lives. Searches during the following day recovered seventeen Macaw crewmen from atoll beaches, buoys, and distant spots in the lagoon. During the sinking her commanding officer, Paul Burton, and four crewmen died after abandoning ship. Macaw was struck from the Navy list 25 March 1944.

Following the sinking of Macaw, the decision was made to clear the channel and level the hulk in place. The crew from the  worked on the site through 9 September 1944. A total of 1,086 diving hours were spent salvaging equipment and materials and placing demolition charges. More than two and one-half tons of explosives were used.

Between 2003 and 2009 the wreck of Macaw was surveyed by the National Oceanic and Atmospheric Administration.

References

External links

 Photo gallery at Navsource.org
 On Eternal Patrol – USS Macaw
 

Chanticleer-class submarine rescue ships
Ships built in Oakland, California
1942 ships
World War II auxiliary ships of the United States
Maritime incidents in January 1944
Maritime incidents in February 1944
World War II shipwrecks in the Pacific Ocean